Veleropilina segonzaci is a species of monoplacophoran, a superficially limpet-like marine mollusc. It is found on the Mid-Atlantic Ridge.

Anatomy
It has only three pairs of gills, instead of five pairs as in all other Veleropilina species with known anatomies.

References

Monoplacophora
Molluscs described in 2001